The Miracle in Espoo, known in Finnish as Ihme Espoossa, was the 2019 IIHF Women's World Championship semifinal game played on 13 April 2019, at Espoo Metro Areena in Espoo, Finland, between Canada (10-time world champion) and hosts Finland (12-time bronze medalists). It is considered one of the biggest upsets in women's ice hockey history.

The semifinal game determines the winner that will advance to the gold medal game, while the loser will play in the bronze medal game. Finland stunned Canada with a score of 4–2, winning their first semifinal game and advanced to the gold medal game for the first time in IIHF Women's World Championship history, while Canada will play for bronze.

Background 
Since the first IIHF Women's World Championship in 1990 and the first women's tournament at the Winter Olympics in 1998, the American and Canadian national teams have dominated the competitions, winning every single gold medal. They have also won every single silver medal, except one: Sweden's historical run to the finals in the 2006 Winter Olympics.

Game sheet

References

2018–19 in Finnish ice hockey
2019 IIHF Women's World Ice Hockey Championships
April 2019 sports events in Europe
Canada women's national ice hockey team
Canada–Finland sports relations
Finland women's national ice hockey team
Ice hockey games
Women's ice hockey
Sport in Espoo
History of ice hockey